Monuafe island was an islet located in Tonga. Erosion began in 2002 and the island was completely submerged in 2014.

References

Former islands of Tonga